Hero High was a 1981–1982 cartoon and live action series created by Filmation that aired as part of NBC's The Kid Super Power Hour with Shazam! It was about a high school where young superheroes were taught how to use their powers and fight crime. Originally intended to be a new entry in Filmation's long-running line of Archie cartoon series, the 1981 series was altered at the last minute because the company's rights to the Archie characters had expired and new characters had to be created.

26 episodes were produced, with 13 eight-minute stories and 13 twelve-minute stories.

Main characters

The Hero High Singing Group

The actors who voice the Hero High cartoon characters perform onstage as their characters each week in live-action song-of-the-week and comedy-sketch segments during the program.

The Hero High Singing Group:

 Captain California: Lead Vocals
 Glorious Gal: Keyboards/Organ, Background Vocals
 Weatherman: Keyboards/Organ, Trumpet, Background Vocals
 Misty Magic: Tambourine, Background Vocals
 Dirty Trixie: Bass Guitar, Background Vocals
 Rex Ruthless: Drums, Background Vocals
 Punk Rock: Lead Guitar, Background Vocals

Guest characters
Occasionally, Captain Marvel and Mary Marvel from the Shazam! segments would appear as guest characters during the Hero High segments, along with Isis, an Egyptian superheroine originally created by Filmation for the 1975 series, The Secrets of Isis. Some of the Hero High characters would also appear during the Shazam! segments.

Episode list

DVD release
BCI Eclipse LLC (under its Ink & Paint classic animation entertainment label, under license from then-rightsholder Entertainment Rights) released Hero High: The Complete Series on DVD in Region 1 on May 8, 2007. The 2 disc set includes many special features. The episodes presented uncut, digitally remastered and in syndication order.

Features:
 Full-length Audio Commentaries for episode "A Fistful of Knuckles" and the Kid Super-Power Hour wraparound segments and song.
 Hero High Spotlight interviews with actors, producers, writers and artists (55 minutes)
 "The Magic of Filmation" Documentary: A half-hour history of the animation studio, with producers, writers, animators, historians, and other Filmation personnel.
 Rare "Kid Super Power Hour" footage (approx. 20 minutes): the live-action opening credits, joke segments, and theme song.
 Hero High Art and Photo Gallery
 Booklet with Episode Guide and Trivia
 DVD-ROM Material: Scripts and Storyboards
 Trailers of other Ink & Paint releases

References

External links
 
 Big Cartoon DataBase: Hero High

1980s American animated television series
1980s American high school television series
1981 American television series debuts
1982 American television series endings
Television series by Filmation
Television series by Warner Bros. Television Studios
NBC original programming
Teen animated television series
Teen superhero television series
Television shows based on Archie Comics
American television series with live action and animation
American children's animated superhero television series